Indonesia Commodity and Derivatives Exchange (ICDX) is the commodity and derivatives based exchange in Indonesia.

Indonesia is the largest producer in the world for many prime commodity products in the soft agricultural, metal and energy sectors.

ICDX is the internationally known commodity and derivatives based exchange in Indonesia. Which is not owned by any Indonesia government by shares, relative to some private financial company, many foreign banks assume ICDX could be a dangerous company to provide any transactions.   

As 2019, this private institution ICDX which is cooperated with PT. Timah company to be only one dominate tin provider in Indonesia, which already causes all other local smelters out of business by unfavourable and unfair regulations. ICDX currently be listed into unstable trade market platform, and unable to turn into international metal trade stage. Unlike the London Metal Exchange, which is in conditions to assist members, ICDX is more like a local institution to square their members.

Membership
ICDX is an Exchange supported by its members who are brokers and traders approved by BAPPEBTI (Badan Pengawas Perdagangan Berjangka Komoditi or Commodity Futures Trading Authority). The member of ICDX facilitates services clients’ transactions covering ICDX products. Trading in ICDX may be settled, guarantee and cleared by Indonesia Clearing House.

ICDX membership consists of traders, brokerage firms, and foreign traders (remote members). All members have to register into membership process, member fees, annual fees to active the trade transactions as the Exchange clearing members. ICDX are connect with Indonesia government regulations departments, also keeping change rules to their members. Cause many members prefer to not active their trades, and only put names on the list to pretend show their loyalty as members.

ICDX members

Trader members
 PT. Aperdi
 PT. Bakriesumatera Plantation TBK
 PT. Budinabati Perkasa BW Plantation TBK
 PT. Capitalmegah Mandiri
 PT. Duta Palmanusantara
 PT. Goldentropical
 PT. Halimmitradana International
 PT. Intikencana Mas
 PT. Intermultiinvest Fortuna
 PT. Ivo Mastunggal
 PT. Jasa Muliaforexindo
 PT. Karya Dutapersada
 PT. Kreasi Erabaru
 PT. Logammulia Pratama
 PT. Musm Mas
 PT. Bangka Tin Industry
 PT. Palm Masasri
 PT. Prolindobuana Semesta
 PT. Sinar Masagro Resources and Technology TBK
 PT. Royalassetindoi
 PT. Salim Ivomaspratama TBK
 PT. Sampoernaagro TBK
 PT. Sari Dumaisejati
 PT. Surya Anugrah Mulya
 PT. Wilmar Nabati Indonesia
 PT. Comexindo International
 PT. Mitrastania Prima
 PT. Refined Bangka Tin
 PT. Artha Cipta Langgeng
 Tambang Timah Timah (Persero) TBK
 Timah Industri
 PT. Graha Initmas  
 PT. Inti Stania Prima
 Muti Gold
 Uni Bros Metal PTE
 Indometal (London)
 PT. Prima Timah Utama

Broker Member
 PT. Midtou Aryacom Futures
 PT. Fasting Futures
 PT. First State Futures
 PT. Global Artha Futures
 PT. International Mitra Futures
 PT. Inter Pan Pasifik Futures
 PT. Jalatama Artha Berjangka
 PT. Jireh Trillions Berjangka
 PT. Kontaperkasa Futures
 PT. Monex Investindo Futures
 PT. Global Kapital Investama Berjangka
 PT. Optima Capitali Futures
 PT. Pacific 2000 Futures
 PT. Phillip Futures
 PT. Platon Niaga Berjangka
 PT. Prima Tangguharta Futures
 PT. Rifan Financindo Berjangka
 PT. Sinarmas Futures
 PT. Solid Gold Berjangka
 PT. Topgrowth Futures
 PT. Trijaya Pratama Futures
 PT. United Asia Futures
 PT. Victory International Futures
 PT. Multi Mulia Investama Berjangka
 PT. Century Investment Futures
 PT. Midtou Aryacom Futures

Remote Member
 Uni Bros Metal PTE
 H Monde
 Dawwoo International
 Gold Matrix Resources PTE
 Great Force Trading
 Multi Gold
 Noble Resources International PTE
 Purple Products
 Toyotoa Tsusho Corporation
 Gain Global Market
 Westin Trade Global
 Indometal (London)
 Eco Tropical Resources
 My United Traders
 Amalgamet Metal
 TCC Trading
 Quanzhou Zhongquan Mining 
 Lomasasta Singapore PTE

Product

ICDX offers a wide range of commodity products which includes the three major groups of commodities: Metals, Soft Agricultural Products, and Energy. More products will be added to ICDX’s growing list of products in phases.
 
Indonesia ICDX has launched:

gold contract  
-	Delivery  
-	Non delivery

 Crude palm oil futures Contracts
 Olein futures contract
 Tin physical contracts
 Foreign currency contracts

References
 ICDX

Commodity exchanges
Economy of Indonesia
Palm oil production in Indonesia
Stock exchanges in Indonesia